Gustav Adolf Skytte af Duderhof (1637 – 21 April 1663) was a Swedish nobleman.  He became a pirate  and plundered ships in the Baltic Sea in the years 1657 to 1662.

Biography
Skytte was born at Strömsrum  Manor in the parish of Ålems at Mönsterås  in Kalmar County, Sweden. His parents were Anna Bielkenstjerna  (c. 1617-1663)  and Jacob Skytte af Duderhof (1616-1654) who served as  governor of Östergötland  during 1645-1650. He was the grandson of  Swedish governor, Johan Skytte (1577–1645) and nephew of the  salonist and poet Vendela Skytte (1608–1629).

In 1657, Skytte hired a Dutch ship together with some of his friends. Out on the sea, the noblemen murdered the captain and took over the ship, which they used as a pirate ship, attacking ships in the Baltic Sea.  One of his colleagues was his brother-in-law Gustaf Drake (1634-1684) the husband of his sister Christina Anna Skytte (1643–1677).  They pursued this secret business from a base in Blekinge, Sweden.
In 1659, Gustav Skytte married Brita Margareta Hamilton, daughter of Colonel Hugo Hamilton (c.1607-1678). In 1662, his pirate activity was exposed.  Christina Anna and Gustaf Drake fled the country, but Gustav Skytte was arrested and put on trial. He was convicted of piracy and was executed at Jönköping in 1663.

Gustav Skytte was featured  by Viktor Rydberg (1828-1895) in the  1857 novel The Freebooter of the Baltic (Fribytaren på Östersjön  Stockholm:
Albert Bonniers förlag).

See also
 Lars Gathenhielm

References

Other sources
 
 

1637 births
1663 deaths
People from Kalmar
17th-century Swedish people
Executed Swedish people
People executed by the Swedish Empire
People executed for piracy
Swedish pirates
17th-century executions by Sweden
People of the Swedish Empire